The 1980 Stanford Cardinals football team represented Stanford University in the Pacific-10 Conference during the 1980 NCAA Division I-A football season. Following the surprise resignation of Rod Dowhower after one season in January, Stanford's new head coach was alumnus Paul Wiggin,  and he led the Cardinals to a 6–5 record (3–4 in Pac-10, tied for sixth). Home games were played on campus at Stanford Stadium in Stanford, California. 

Hired in February, Wiggin was a former star defensive end at Stanford (All-Pacific Coast in 1955, 1956), played eleven years in the NFL, was a head coach for three seasons with the Kansas City Chiefs (1975–77), and most recently was the defensive coordinator of the New Orleans Saints.

After the season in December, offensive coordinator Dennis Green became the head coach at Northwestern in the Big Ten Conference, and receivers/backs coach Jim Fassel was promoted. Green returned to Stanford as head coach in 1989.

Schedule

Roster

Season summary

at California

Two costly fumbles and being stopped on the goal line with 1:07 left, ended Stanford's season on a sour note, and knocked them out of possible Peach Bowl consideration.

References

External links
 Official game program: Stanford at Washington State – October 25, 1980

Stanford
Stanford Cardinal football seasons
Stanford Cardinals football